Uchastok №28 is a rural locality (a settlement) in Shaninskoye Rural Settlement, Talovsky District, Voronezh Oblast, Russia. The population was 216 as of 2010. There are 3 streets.

Geography 
Uchastok №28 is located 18 km northeast of Talovaya (the district's administrative centre) by road. Uchastok №4 is the nearest rural locality.

References 

Rural localities in Talovsky District